The 1996–97 Biathlon World Cup was a multi-race tournament over a season of biathlon, organised by the International Biathlon Union. The season started on 30 November 1996 in Lillehammer, Norway, and ended on 16 March 1997 in Novosibirsk, Russia. It was the 20th season of the Biathlon World Cup.

Calendar
Below is the IBU World Cup calendar for the 1996–97 season.

World Cup Podium

Men

Women

Men's team

Women's team

Standings: Men

Overall 

Final standings after 19 races.

Individual 

Final standings after 6 races.

Sprint 

Final standings after 9 races.

Pursuit 

Final standings after 4 races.

Relay 

Final standings after 5 races.

Nation 

Final standings after 20 races.

Standings: Women

Overall 

Final standings after 19 races.

Individual 

Final standings after 6 races.

Sprint 

Final standings after 9 races.

Pursuit 

Final standings after 4 races.

Relay 

Final standings after 5 races.

Nation 

Final standings after 20 races.

Medal table

Achievements
Victory in this World Cup (all-time number of victories in parentheses)

Men
 , 4 (7) first places
 , 3 (8) first places
 , 3 (4) first places
 , 2 (6) first places
 , 2 (6) first places
 , 2 (2) first places
 , 1 (5) first place
 , 1 (1) first place
 , 1 (1) first place

Women
 , 4 (6) first places
 , 3 (11) first places
 , 3 (5) first places
 , 2 (3) first places
 , 1 (9) first place
 , 1 (3) first place
 , 1 (2) first place
 , 1 (2) first place
 , 1 (1) first place
 , 1 (1) first place
 , 1 (1) first place

Retirements
The following notable biathletes retired after the 1996–97 season:

References

External links
IBU official site

Biathlon World Cup
1996 in biathlon
1997 in biathlon